Nikolay or Nikolai Krasnov may refer to:

 Nikolay Krasnov (soldier) (1833-1900), General of the Imperial Russian Army and Cossack historian
 Nikolay Krasnov (architect) (1864-1939), Russian-Serbian architect
 Nikolai Krasnov (pilot) (1914-1945), Soviet flying ace